Yanbian Funde F.C. was a Chinese football club. The team was based in Yanji, Yanbian Korean Autonomous Prefecture, Jilin province where their home stadium is the Yanji Nationwide Fitness Centre Stadium that has a seating capacity of 30,000.

The club's predecessor was originally called Jilin Football Team and they achieved one top tier domestic league title before 1994, when the club was reorganized to become a completely professional football unit. At the end of the 2000 league campaign, the club was relegated from the top tier of Chinese football, however, the club faced financial difficulties and sold the first team as well as the franchise to Zhejiang Green Town. After the sale, the club assembled the reserve team and joined the third tier before they eventually gained promotion to the second tier in 2004, and first tier in 2015. It was dissolved just before the 2019 season due to owing taxes.

History
In 1955 the local Jilin government sports body would form Jilin Football Team to take part in the recently expanded Chinese football league and built a team composed mostly of Koreans, taken from the large local Korean population. After predominantly establishing themselves as a top tier side the club achieved their first piece of silverware when they went on to win the 1965 league title. The Chinese Cultural Revolution unfortunately saw football in China halted and Jilin were unable to immediately defend their title until football returned in the 1973 league season where they finished seventh. The following seasons would see the club struggle within the league and spend several short spells within the second tier until at the end of the 1988 league season saw the Chinese Football Association restructure the league, which not only saw the club relegated but to the third tier.

After a brief period within the third tier the club would have a resurgence and win the 1990 division title as well as promotion back into the top division after coming second within the 1992 second tier and a guaranteed spot in China's first fully professional 1994 Chinese Jia-A League season. To conform to full professionalism they were allowed to be sponsored by Samsung and changed their team name to Jilin Samsung. The club's foray into professionalism would see them gradually establish themselves within the division under the management of Li Huen. With a foundation to build on former South Korean Head coach Choi Eun-taek was brought into the team at the beginning of the 1997 league season and he immediately guided them to become title contenders with a fourth-place finish at the end of the season. Unfortunately the team were unable to build upon their previous season's results and Choi Eun-taek left the club, which saw Gao Hui take over the team until the club experienced relegation in 2000. The demotion was taken exceptionally hard and the club had to sell their Chinese FA registration and entire first-team to Zhejiang Green Town for 25 million Yuan. The following 2001 league campaign saw the club start at the bottom of the Chinese pyramid in the third tier with a team assembled from their former reserve squad. After taking time to gell the team would eventually come second within the 2004 season and win promotion into the second tier.

On 18 February 2013, the Chinese FA issued the club with a three-point deduction and a fine of CNY500,000 for accepting a bribe from Guangzhou Pharmaceutical to lose their 3 June 2006 eleventh round league game. The club's officials would attempt to appeal the decision, but failed after the game in question had already seen Guangzhou fined and relegated for their involvement three years earlier in China's long-running battle against match-fixing. The club's manager at the time Gao Hui was already found to be guilty of facilitating the match-fixing and was given a three-year prison sentence on 18 February 2012.

Yanbian Changbai Tiger changed their name to Yanbian Changbaishan on 8 February 2014. On the field the club struggled throughout the whole of the 2014 league season and finished 16th within the league, in the relegation zone. On 31 January 2015 second tier club Shaanxi Wuzhou unexpectedly failed to register for the 2015 league season due to wage arrears and was dissolved as a football club, which allowed Yanbian to remain within the division. With this reprieve insurance company Funde Holdings became interested in sponsoring the team and on 26 June 2015 signed a four-year sponsorship deal worth CNY80 million (US$12.9 million) with the club.

On 26 February 2019, Yanbian Funde was dissolved due to owing taxes, thus ending its 64-year history.

Name history

Managerial history

 Piao Wanfu (1962–66)
 Li Huen (1991–95)
 Zheng Zhongxie (1995)
 Li Huen (1996)
 Choi Eun-taek (1997–98)
 Gao Hui (1998–00)
 Li Huen (2000–03)
 Gao Hui (2004–07)
 Zhao Yongyuan (2008–09)
 Jin Guangzhu (2009–11)
 Zheng Xianglong (2011–12)
 Cho Keung-yeon (2012)
 Jin Guangzhu (Interim) (2012)
 Cho Keung-yeon (2013)
 Li Guanghao (Interim) (2013)
 Li Huen (2014)
 Li Guanghao (2014)
 Gao Zhongxun (Interim) (2014)
 Park Tae-ha (2015–2018)
 Cho Jong-Hwa (Interim) (2018)
 Hwang Sun-hong (2019)

Honours
All-time honours list including semi-professional Jilin FC period.

League
Chinese Jia-A League/Chinese Super League (Top Tier League)
Winners (1): 1965
Chinese Jia B League/China League One (Second Tier League)
Winners (1): 2015
Chinese Yi League/China League Two(Third Tier League)
Winners (1): 1990

Results
All-time league rankings

As of the end of 2018 season.

No league games in 1959, 1966–72, 1975; Jilin didn't compete in 1984
 In group stage. In final group stage.  In North League. * Promoted to 1994 top tier.  Retrospectively deducted 3 points for a match-fixing scandal in 2006.  Guangdong Sunray Cave and Chengdu Tiancheng dissolved, so Yanbian could stay at second level.. * Relegated for financial trouble.

Key
<div>

 Pld = Played
 W = Games won
 D = Games drawn
 L = Games lost
 F = Goals for
 A = Goals against
 Pts = Points
 Pos = Final position

 DNQ = Did not qualify
 DNE = Did not enter
 NH = Not Held
 – = Does Not Exist
 R1 = Round 1
 R2 = Round 2
 R3 = Round 3
 R4 = Round 4

 F = Final
 SF = Semi-finals
 QF = Quarter-finals
 R16 = Round of 16
 Group = Group stage
 GS2 = Second Group stage
 QR1 = First Qualifying Round
 QR2 = Second Qualifying Round
 QR3 = Third Qualifying Round

Notable players
Had international caps for their respective countries.
Yanbian F.C. period

Africa
 Aboubakar Oumarou
 Bubacarr Trawally
 Daniel Quaye
 Emiliano Té
 Soumaila Coulibaly
 Abdulafees Abdulsalam
 Jean-Paul Eale Lutula
 Zola Kiniambi

Asia
 Chi Wenyi
 Chi Zhongguo
 Jin Jingdao
 Piao Cheng
 Kim Yong-jun
 Hwang Il-su
 Kim Seung-dae
 Ko Ki-gu
 Yoon Bit-garam

Europe
 Valdet Rama
 Richárd Guzmics

Jilin F.C. period

Africa
 Claude Kalisa
 Cheikh Gadiaga
 Zola Kiniambi
 Bulayima Mukuayanzo

Asia
 Cui Guangri
 Gao Zhongxun
 Jiang Feng
 Jin Guangzhu
 Li Hongjun
 Xu Jingxiu

Europe
 András Telek

References

External links
 Sina Weibo

 
2019 disestablishments in China
Association football clubs disestablished in 2019
Football clubs in China
Sport in Yanbian
Association football clubs established in 1955
1955 establishments in China